Streptococcus constellatus is a species of Streptococcus that is part of the normal flora in the oral cavity, urogenital region, and intestinal tract. However, it can frequently cause purulent infections in other parts of the body. DNA homology studies and 16S rRNA sequence analysis demonstrate S. constellatus belongs to the Streptococcus anginosus group (milleri group) along with Streptococcus intermedius and Streptococcus anginosus.

Morphology
S. constellatus are gram positive, non-sporing, non-motile, catalase negative cocci. The cells are small, normally 0.5-1μm in diameter and form short chains. Their cell wall peptidoglycan is composed of Lys-Ala1-3 and has a DNA G+C content of 37-38%.

Metabolism and growth
In the presence of CO2 growth is enhanced, under aerobic conditions growth is reduced, and some strains require anaerobic conditions to grow.

S. constellatus produces major amounts of lactic acid, fermented glucose, maltose and sucrose, but not lactose and hydrolyzed aesculin.

Biochemical characteristics

The typical species is Lancefield Groups A,C, G, and F, with the remaining NG (non-groupable) and haemolysis on blood agar is β-haemolytic and NH (non-haemolytic).

Disease

Clinically it is associated with abscess formation in the upper body and respiratory tract. It has also been found to be involved with pulmonary exacerbations in cystic fibrosis patients and can lead to toxic shock and limb amputation.

Subspecies
Evidence supports the further subdivision of S. constellatus into three subspecies, S. constellatus subsp. constellatus and S. constellatus subsp. pharyngis and Streptococcus constellatus subsp. viborgensis.

S. constellatus subsp. constellatus 
Normally found in the oral cavities and upper respiratory tracts and isolated from purulent human infections, including appendicitis. Strains are frequently β-haemolyic and belong to Lancefield Group F or are nonhaemolytic (α and γ) and  serologically ungroupable. However, a few strains react with Lancefield Group A, C, and G antisera.

Most strains produce:
 α-glucosidase, but very few produce: β-galactosidase and β-glucosidase

Most strains do NOT produce:
 β-N-acetylglucosaminidase
 β-D-fucosidase
 α-galactosidase
 β-glucuronidase
 pyrrolidonylarylamidase
 sialidase

S. constellatus subsp. pharyngis
Normally found in infections of the human throat, patients with pharyngitis.  Strains frequency are β-haemolytic and belong to Lancefield C.

Most strains produce:
 β-N-acetylgalactosaminidase
 β-D-fucosidase
 α-galactosidase
 α-glucosidase
 β-glucosdiase
 β-N-acetylglucosaminidase

Most strains do NOT produce:
 α-galactosidase
 β-glucuronidase
 pyrrolidonylarylamidase
 sialidase

See also
 Streptococcus milleri group
 Streptococcus intermedius
 Streptococcus anginosus

References

External links
Type strain of Streptococcus constellatus at BacDive -  the Bacterial Diversity Metadatabase

Streptococcaceae